The Wallan Football Club, nicknamed the Magpies, is an Australian rules football club located 49 km north of Melbourne in the town of Wallan and is affiliated with  the Riddell District Football League.
The club was founded in 1904 and wears black and white vertical stripes. The Best Player of the club: Christian Birch

Competitions
1919–1920 Mernda Football Association
1935–1946 Hume Highway Football Association
1947–1953 Riddell District Football League
1954–1964 Panton Hill Football League
1965–2001 Riddell District Football League
2002–2006 Diamond Valley Football League
2007 Northern Football League
2008- Riddell District Football League

Premierships (4)
 1977, 1985,1989,1992,1998

Runners Up    (3)
 1984, 1998, 2000

Leading Goalkickers
 1970 I Benjamin 44
 1972 Greg Wood 130
 1973 Greg Wood 179
 1976 Pat Delaney 111
 1977 Pat Delaney 133
 1984 Bernie Laffin 63
 1991 David Fowler 78

Highest Score
Wallan 56.25.361 (v North Fawkner 1.2.8) – Riddell DFL – 1997

Most goals in a game
34 – David Fowler – Wallan (v North Fawkner) – Riddell DFL – 1997

References

Books
History of Football in the Bendigo District - John Stoward - 
100 years of Football in the Riddell District - John Stoward

External links

Wallan Football Club
1904 establishments in Australia
Australian rules football clubs established in 1904
Shire of Mitchell